is a Shinto shrine in the Masumida neighborhood of the city of Ichinomiya in Aichi Prefecture, Japan. It is the ichinomiya of former Owari Province. The main festival of the shrine is held annually on April 3.

Enshrined kami
The kami enshrined at Masumida Jinja is:
 , kami of the sun and agriculture, the younger brother (or father) of Ninigi, and the ancestor of the Owari clan, the prehistoric rulers of the area.
Beppyo shrines

History
The date of Masumida Shrine's foundation is unknown. Shrine tradition and the Kujiki records give the unlikely date of 628 BC, or the third day of the third month of the 33rd year in the reign of Emperor Jimmu, when the spirit of Amenohoakari was brought to Owari from the Mount Katsuragi in Yamato Province.  Another tradition gives the date of foundation to the reign of the semi-legendary Emperor Suinin (97 BC – 30 BC).  The shrine is located near the site of the provincial capital of Owari Province, established in the Nara period and features in the Yamato Takeru myth cycle. During the early Heian period, it appears in the Rikkokushi and in the Engishiki records. It has been styled as the ichinomiya of Owari Province since at least the end of the Heian period.

In 1584, after the shrine was damaged by an earthquake, it was rebuilt by Toyotomi Hideyoshi. It was subsequently supported by the Tokugawa shogunate  and Owari Domain until the end of the Edo period. The shrine was destroyed in the Ichinomiya air raid of 1945 and was not rebuilt until 1951, with reconstruction taking ten years.

The shrine is located ten-minutes on foot from either Owari-Ichinomiya Station on the JR Central Tōkaidō Main Line or Meitetsu Ichinomiya Station on the Kintetsu Railway Nagoya Main Line

Gallery

Cultural properties

Important Cultural Properties
, set of 12,  ten from the Kamakura period, two from the Muromachi period, donation from Juntoku Tenno
, set of 25 items, including lacquer trays, saucers and bowls, dated 1457

Registered Tangible Cultural Properties

See also
 List of Shinto shrines
 Ichinomiya

References
 Plutschow, Herbe. (1996). Matsuri: The Festivals of Japan. London: RoutledgeCurzon.
 Ponsonby-Fane, Richard Arthur Brabazon. (1959).  The Imperial House of Japan. Kyoto: Ponsonby Memorial Society.

External links

 
 Aichi Prefecture tourist information

Notes

Ichinomiya, Aichi
Shinto shrines in Aichi Prefecture
Important Cultural Properties of Japan
Owari Province
Ichinomiya